The 1948 Giro d'Italia was the 31st edition of the Giro d'Italia, organized and sponsored by the newspaper La Gazzetta dello Sport. The race was won by the Italian rider Fiorenzo Magni of the Wilier Triestina team, with fellow Italians Ezio Cecchi and Giordano Cottur coming in second and third respectively.

Teams

A total of eleven teams entered the 1948 Giro d'Italia. Each team sent a squad of seven riders, so the Giro began with a peloton of 77 cyclists. Out of the 77 riders that started this edition of the Giro d'Italia, a total of 44 riders made it to the finish in Milan.

The teams entering the race were:

Legnano

Peugeot
Viani-C.R.A.L. Imperia

Route and stages

Race organizer and newspaper La Gazzetta dello Sport released the preliminary route for the Giro d'Italia on 27 October 1947. The race was originally planned to start on 22 May and finish on 13 June, while covering  over nineteen stages.

Race overview

During stage 9 from Bari to Naples, Magni –who was down nine minutes at the time– joined the day's breakaway.

During the Giro, the French and Belgian teams left the race because they thought it was made impossible for foreign riders to ride the Giro. When the leader Magni was punished with only two minutes after being pushed up a mountain, Fausto Coppi and his Bianchi team also left the race out of protest. As a result, only forty riders finished the Giro. Stage seventeen featured several climbs including the Pordoi Pass. Coppi won the stage, but Magni–who had a reputation for struggling on big climbs–finished in time to retain the lead. It was discovered that Magni had been helped up the Pordoi, while some state he was pushed by spectators others say he was pulled by a car. Coppi and Bianchi requested Magni to be thrown out. As there were no photos, the race jury had to go based on testimonies. It was officially declared that the pushing Magni received was planned. The punishment was a two-minute penalty in the general classification, which still allowed him to remain in the lead. Coppi and his team decided to withdraw after that decision.

Classification leadership

The leader of the general classification – calculated by adding the stage finish times of each rider – wore a pink jersey. This classification is the most important of the race, and its winner is considered as the winner of the Giro.

In the mountains classification, the race organizers selected different mountains that the route crossed and awarded points to the riders who crossed them first. The winner of the team classification was determined by adding the finish times of the best three cyclists per team together and the team with the lowest total time was the winner. If a team had fewer than three riders finish, they were not eligible for the classification.

There was a black jersey (maglia nera) awarded to the rider placed last in the general classification. The classification was calculated in the same manner as the general classification.

The prize money for the winner of the race was one million lire. The prize money increased to one million this year because Totip, a horse race betting company, sponsored the race.

The rows in the following table correspond to the jerseys awarded after that stage was run.

Final standings

General classification

Mountains classification

Team classification

Aftermath
The Italian cycling federation gave Coppi a suspension of one month because he refused to finish the Giro. After being caught cheating, Magni was the subject of the tifosi's animosity, he was frequently booed and writing on the road included the phrase Abbasso Magni. After winning the final stage into Milan's Vignorelli Velodrome, the crowd's behavior (whistles, boos, and anti–Magni banners) reduced him to tears. The Communist Mayor of Prato sent Magni a telegram congratulating him on the victory, stating that his victory brough "honor to [their] city." Later in his life, Magni said that the telegram pleased him greatly.

References

Citations

Bibliography

 
1948
Giro d'Italia
Giro d'Italia
Giro d'Italia
Giro d'Italia
Giro d'Italia